"The Green Meadow" is a short story by H. P. Lovecraft and Winifred V. Jackson written in 1918/1919 and published in the spring 1927 issue of The Vagrant. As in their other collaboration, "The Crawling Chaos", both authors used pseudonyms — the tale was published as by "Elizabeth Neville Berkeley" (Jackson) and "Lewis Theobald, Jun." (Lovecraft). Lovecraft wrote the entire text but Jackson is credited since it was based on a dream she had experienced.

Plot 
In 1913, near the (fictional) seaside village of Potowonket, Maine, a meteorite crashes into the sea. A fishing vessel hauls in the meteor, and scientists soon examine it. Within the meteor is a small notebook, made of some indestructible material and written in classical Greek. The notebook is the first-person account of a man trapped on a small, disintegrating island who seems threatened by shadowy forces and ultimately discovers Stethelos, a city from Lovecraft's Dream Cycle Mythos.

Connections 
The city Stethelos is also mentioned in the short story "The Quest of Iranon".

Reprints 
The tale was published in Beyond the Wall of Sleep (Arkham House, 1943). The corrected text is collected in Lovecraft's revisions volume The Horror in the Museum and Other Revisions (Arkham House, 1970).

References

External links
 

Fiction set in 1913
1927 short stories
Maine in fiction
Fiction about meteoroids
Short stories by H. P. Lovecraft
Works originally published in American magazines
Collaborative short stories